Bill Finlayson (2 January 1904 – 14 June 1976) was  a former Australian rules footballer who played with Richmond in the Victorian Football League (VFL).

Notes

External links 
		

1904 births
1976 deaths
Australian rules footballers from Victoria (Australia)
Richmond Football Club players
Ballarat Football Club players